Dr. Mahalingam College of Engineering and Technology (MCET) is a self – financing educational institution situated in Pollachi, Coimbatore District. MCET is the vision of Arutchelvar Dr. N. Mahalingam, whose determination and dynamism made possible the realization of this institution of excellence. MCET was established in 1998 to commemorate the 75th Birthday of this great visionary Arutchelvar Dr. N. Mahalingam.

References

External links 
 

Engineering colleges in Coimbatore
Colleges affiliated to Anna University